Jaugeliškiai is a village in Jonava district municipality, in Kaunas County, in central Lithuania. According to the 2011 census, the village has a population of 63 people.

References

Villages in Jonava District Municipality